Joan Lowell (born Helen Wagner; November 23, 1902 – November 7, 1967) was a movie actress of the silent film era from Berkeley, California. Lowell published a sensational autobiography, Cradle of the Deep, in 1929, which turned out to be fictionalized.

Early life
According to the Cradle of the Deep, Lowell's mother was hailing from Boston's Lowell family, and her father was the son of a landowner from Montenegro and a Turkish woman. Lowell feared that her father, Captain Nicholas Wagner (Preacher Nick), had died on December 24, 1924. Newspapers reported that his ship, the Oceanic Vance, sank off the coast of Mexico. Two weeks overdue in Los Angeles, California, the schooner was sighted in January 1925, fifteen miles (24 km) northwest of San Diego. The Oceanic Vance had lost her convoy, the schooner Westerner, on Christmas Eve, 1924.

Actually, Joan Lowell was born in Berkeley, California. She studied in the Garfield Junior High School in Berkeley. She attended the Munson School for Private Secretaries in San Francisco, where she obtained stenographer's skills.

Her father was a ship captain who sailed on the Minnie A. Caine and reportedly took his wife and daughter, then thirteen, for a trip with him. 

She changed her name from Helen Wagner after taking acting lessons to help her get into the movie industry.

Movie actress

Lowell received her dramatic training from Gwendolen Logan Seiler and became an extra at Goldwyn Pictures at the age of 17. She played bit parts in motion pictures also as an extra. One of her first efforts was the role of Madge Barlow in the movie Loving Lies (1924). She was featured with Monte Blue in Cap'n Dan and in the Thompson Buchanan theater production of The Cub (1915).

After completing a leading part in Branded a Thief (1924), about Mexican frontier life, Lowell was chosen as the "Queen of the Fourth of July" for 1924 in Tijuana, Mexico. She was selected by Senor De Los Rios, a noted bullfighter from Spain.

Her last screen role was in Adventure Girl (1934), a film directed by Herman C. Raymaker and loosely based on her fictionalized autobiography. In 1935, Lowell sued Van Beuren Studios and Amedee J. Van Beuren for an accounting of the profits. Van Beuren promptly made a counterclaim for $300,000, damages allegedly sustained because of Lowell's "inexpert" performance in the picture.

Autobiographer

In 1929, Joan Lowell wrote an autobiography, Cradle of the Deep, published by Simon & Schuster, in which she claimed that her seafaring father took her aboard his ship, the Minnie A. Caine, at the age of three months when she was suffering from malnutrition and nursed her back to health. She also claimed that she lived on the ship, with its all-male crew, until she was 17, during which time she became skilled in the art of seamanship and once harpooned a whale by herself. She claimed that the ship ultimately burned and sank off Australia, and that she swam three miles to safety with a family of kittens clinging by their claws to her back. In fact, the autobiography was a fabrication; Lowell had been on the ship, which remained safely in California, for only 15 months. The book was a sensational best seller until it was exposed as pure invention. 

The Cradle of the Deep was later parodied by Corey Ford in his book Salt Water Taffy, in which Lowell abandons the sinking ship (which had previously sunk several times before, "very badly") and swims to safety with her manuscript.

Later in 1929, Lowell's book about growing up at sea was exposed as a fabrication when her former neighbors in Berkeley were interviewed by the San Francisco Chronicle. Simon & Schuster had to reclassify her book as fiction and offer a refund for returns. Despite all newspaper revelations and ensuing controversy, the book continued to sell well.

In an interview, Lowell commented on the fabrication charges as follows:  "Eighty per cent of it was true and the rest I colored up. I made some changes to protect people and the rest to make it better reading. That's an author's privilege."

Author and reporter
She married playwright Thompson Buchanan on October 16, 1927. The couple resided on a  farm three miles (5 km) from New Hope, Pennsylvania. They separated in October 1929. Lowell continued to live in the smaller of two old stone houses on the property. She named the home Joan's Ark. Lowell liked the country, her horses, and books, while Buchanan preferred city life.

Lowell became a newspaper reporter in Boston, Massachusetts, in the early 1930s. She was assaulted by booking agent Morris Levine, who was sentenced to fourteen months in the House of Correction in January 1932. 

Lowell worked for WOR (AM) radio station in New York City in 1934.

Move to Brazil
Joan Lowell married a sea captain, Leek Bowen, in 1936. He took her to the countryside of Brazil to carve out a coffee plantation. Together they owned a farm called "The Anchorage" in the city of Anápolis, a Brazilian municipality of the State of Goiás. Working as a real estate agent, she also sold lands to Hollywood actors and actresses as Janet Gaynor and Mary Martin in Anápolis. She was called "Dona Joana" by the locals and after a long time in Anápolis she made a remarkable trip, crossing the National road "Belém Brasilia" from South to North, driving a Volkswagen. That great adventure was reported in a National magazine during the 1960s. She chronicled their adventures in a book, Promised Land (1952). 

Joan Lowell died in Brasilia, Brazil, in 1967. 

The local Jan Magalinski Institute preserves her archives and researches her history at Anapolis.

References

Further reading
Colcord, L., and Broun, H. Are Literary Hoaxes Harmful? A Debate, The Bookman, June 1929, 69: 347-351
Los Angeles Times, The Dizzy Whirl of the Extra's Life, February 18, 1923, Page III29.
Los Angeles Times, Lobscouse Need Of Puny Infant, July 29, 1923, Page III31.
Los Angeles Times, Men, Women, and Things in the World's News, September 17, 1923, Page I8.
Los Angeles Times, To Entertain at Party Saturday, December 19, 1923, Page II11.
Los Angeles Times, Si Senor, El Toro Has Competition, July 4, 1924, Page A2.
Los Angeles Times, Actress' Father Is Lost at Sea, January 8, 1925, Page A9.
Los Angeles Times, Ship Oceanic Vance Safe, January 10, 1925, Page A6.
Los Angeles Times, Sailor Girl's Tale Spun, March 24, 1929, Page C11.
Los Angeles Times, New York's Best Sellers, April 14, 1929, Page 20.
Los Angeles Times, Joan Lowell's Dream Fades, November 10, 1929, Page 8.
Los Angeles Times, Lowell Attack Brings Sentence, January 27, 1932, Page 1.
Los Angeles Times, Short Talk, August 13, 1934, Page 5.

External links

1902 births
1967 deaths
20th-century American actresses
Actresses from California
American film actresses
American silent film actresses